The Queen's Award for Enterprise: International Trade (Export) (1977) was awarded by Queen Elizabeth II.

Recipients
The following organisations were awarded this year.

 William Hare Group Ltd

References

Queen's Award for Enterprise: International Trade (Export)
1977 in the United Kingdom